William George McCloskey (May 1854 – July 9, 1924) officially played two years of Major League Baseball, in  for the Washington Nationals, debuting on May 25, and in  for the Wilmington Quicksteps of the Union Association. He played 11 games for the Washington Nationals in 1875 at catcher, batting .175 (7-for-40) with one run and four RBI. He played nine games in the 1884 season, splitting time between the outfield and catcher. In 30 at bats, he had three hits for a .100 batting average.
 
Bill died at the age of 70 in his hometown of Philadelphia, Pennsylvania, and is interred at the Arlington Cemetery in Drexel Hill, Pennsylvania.

Baseball historian David Nemec has argued that the evidence is "fairly persuasive" that the "McCloskey" who pitched for Washington in 1875 is Bill McCloskey.

References

External links

1854 births
1924 deaths
19th-century baseball players
Baseball players from Pennsylvania
Major League Baseball outfielders
Major League Baseball catchers
Wilmington Quicksteps players
Philadelphia Athletics (minor league) players
Harrisburg (minor league baseball) players
Wilmington Quicksteps (minor league) players
Trenton Trentonians players
Syracuse Stars (minor league baseball) players
Reading (minor league baseball) players
Binghamton Crickets (1880s) players
Bradford (minor league baseball) players
Sunbury (minor league baseball) players
Buffalo Bisons (minor league) players
Portland (minor league baseball) players
Burials at Arlington Cemetery (Pennsylvania)